Anne Froelick Taylor (December 8, 1913 – January 26, 2010) was an American screenwriter from 1941 to 1950, and later a playwright and novelist. Her screenwriting career ended when she was identified as a communist by two witnesses at a hearing before the HUAC.

Biography
Anne Froelick was born in Hinsdale, Massachusetts, but her family moved to Princeton, New Jersey when she was a child. She briefly attended Smith College before moving to New York City at the age of 19 to try to start an acting career. Beginning in her career in 1938, Taylor was onetime model and actress in New York City, Taylor began her writing career while serving as secretary to Howard Koch, then a writer for Orson Welles' The Mercury Theatre on the Air. Taylor assisted Koch on his adaptation of H.G. Wells' The War of the Worlds which made radio history when it was broadcast that same year.

When Koch went to work as a writer at Warner Bros., he wanted the studio to hire Taylor as a writer. After helping Koch on the psychological themes and rewriting some of the scenes for his screenplay for The Letter, Warner Bros. signed Taylor to a writing contract. Her first screen credit was the 1941 drama Shining Victory, which she co-wrote with Koch. Her screenwriting credits followed: The Master Race, Miss Susie Slagle's, Easy Come, Easy Go, and Harriet Craig.

Taylor was involved in causes such as fighting fascism and promoting unions and desegregation, which reportedly had led her to join the Communist Party. In 1951, Taylor's party membership caused her husband, Philip Taylor, to lose his job as a manufacturing planner at Lockheed. She continued to try to make a living as a writer using her married name. She wrote four plays that were produced locally, including Storm in the Sun. Along with that, she co-wrote a comic novel, Press on Regardless, with Fern Mosk, which was published by Simon & Schuster in 1956.

Anne Froelick Taylor died of natural causes on January 26, 2010, aged 96, in a nursing home in Los Angeles.

References

External links

1913 births
2010 deaths
20th-century American novelists
Screenwriters from New York (state)
American women novelists
Hollywood blacklist
People from Princeton, New Jersey
Writers from New York City
Smith College alumni
American women dramatists and playwrights
20th-century American women writers
20th-century American dramatists and playwrights
People from Hinsdale, Massachusetts
Novelists from New York (state)
Screenwriters from Massachusetts
Screenwriters from New Jersey
21st-century American women